Tiden (Swedish: The Times) is a quarterly theoretical political journal published in Stockholm, Sweden, since 1908. It is organ of the Social Democratic Party. Its original subtitle was Tidskrift för socialistisk kritik och politik (Swedish: Journal of Socialist Criticism and Politics). It is later changed to Socialdemokratisk idé- och debattidskrift (Swedish: Magazine of the Social Democratic Views and Debate).

History and profile
Tiden was established by the Swedish social democrat politician Hjalmar Branting in 1908. It is an official publication of the Social Democratic Party which was started to provide a platform for political and cultural discussions among the party members.

Tiden was a monthly publication from 1908 to 1917. In the period between 1918 and 1929 it came out eight times per year. Then it was published ten times per year from 1930 to 1992. From 1999 its frequency was switched to bimonthly. It is published by Tankesmedjan Tiden, a leftist think tank founded in 2006, on a quarterly basis. The magazine is headquartered in Stockholm.

Editors and contributors
Many leading politicians from the Social Democratic Party edited Tiden, including its founder Hjalmar Branting. The others included Pierre Schori and Gösta Edgren. Sture Henriksson edited the magazine between 1956 and 1957. Since March 2018 its editor-in-chief has been Payam Moula. 

The contributors of Tiden have been mostly members of the party, including Olof Palme. One of them was Birgitta Dahl who published articles on  gender equality. However, it also has had international contributors such as German political scientist Fritz Croner who used the term planned economy for the first time in Tiden during World War I referring to German economic planning. A well-known Swedish economist Gunnar Myrdal also contributed to Tiden publishing articles on the planning of economy in Sweden.

References

External links

1908 establishments in Sweden
Magazines established in 1908
Magazines published in Stockholm
Political magazines published in Sweden
Quarterly magazines published in Sweden
Swedish-language magazines
Swedish Social Democratic Party
Monthly magazines published in Sweden
Eight times annually magazines
Ten times annually magazines
Bi-monthly magazines published in Sweden